Louis van Amstel (born June 23, 1972, in Amsterdam) is a Dutch-American ballroom dance champion, professional dancer, and choreographer who appears on the U.S. reality television series Dancing with the Stars. He is the creator of the popular dance fitness program LaBlast.

Early life
Louis van Amstel was born in Amsterdam; his grandparents were competitive ballroom dancers. He began dancing at 10 and entered competitions at 15. He stopped attending school at 16 to pursue dancing full-time.

Career

Early career
Van Amstel competed professionally with Julie Fryer, and they were coached by Ruud Vermeij. In 1990, Van Amstel and Fryer became Dutch Latin Champions and 10 Dance Champions. They also made the final in the 'under 21' category in Blackpool. During the same year, they received a bronze medal at the German Open, at the World Latin and at the European 10 Dance. In the Worlds 10 Dance Championship, Van Amstel and Fryer got fourth place.

In 1991, Van Amstel and Fryer won the national championships for the second time, and got fourth place in all major championships. A year later, Van Amstel decided that he wanted to retire from competing for a while and ended his partnership with Fryer for the first time. Three years later, in 1994, the partnership was re-established, and Van Amstel and Fryer went on to win three world Latin Dance championship gold medals in 1994, 1995 and 1996.

In 1997, Van Amstel retired from competitive ballroom dancing, moved to New York City, and became an American citizen in July 1999. He returned to competitive dancing with partner Karina Smirnoff; they won the United States national championship in 2000.

Dancing with the Stars
Van Amstel was cast for season one of Dancing with the Stars in early 2005. He was partnered with Trista Sutter, but they were the first to be eliminated from the competition. In the show's second season, he was partnered with hostess Lisa Rinna, with whom he reached fourth place.

Van Amstel returned in season three and was partnered with High School Musical star Monique Coleman. During the eighth week of the competition, they received two 10s for their Cha-Cha-Cha marking Van Amstel's only 10s of Dancing With The Stars for an individual dance for many seasons to come. They made it to the semi-finals, but were eliminated, resulting in a fourth-place finish. He did not participate in the fourth season due to all the females being taller than him, but he nonetheless maintained a role as a performer and choreographer throughout the season and season five.

He returned in season six and was partnered with actress, businesswoman, and wife of Elvis Presley, Priscilla Presley. The couple made it to the fifth week, but were eliminated, resulting in an eighth-place finish.

He returned in season nine and was partnered with reality TV star and singer Kelly Osbourne. The couple made it to the finale where they finished in third place, marking Van Amstel's first and only time to make it to the finals to date. In season ten of Dancing With The Stars, Van Amstel was partnered with Reno 911! star Niecy Nash. The couple made it to the eighth week, but were eliminated, resulting in a fifth-place finish.

For season eleven of Dancing With The Stars, Van Amstel was partnered with actress and comedian Margaret Cho. The couple made it to the third week, but were eliminated, resulting in a tenth-place finish. Van Amstel appeared in Cho's comedy music album Cho Dependent as her therapist. In July 2011, he appeared alongside Cho as himself in the fourth episode of the third season of Drop Dead Diva.

For the show's twelfth season, Van Amstel was partnered with playboy model and reality star Kendra Wilkinson. During the fifth week in the competition, they danced the 1000th competitive dance. The couple made it to the seventh week, but were eliminated, resulting in a sixth-place finish. Wilkinson later published her book, Being Kendra, in which she said she and van Amstel clashed constantly and that he called her dyslexic and learning disabled. Van Amstel denied the comments, calling her book "twisted". Nevertheless, Van Amstel made two appearances on Wilkinson's reality shows Kendra and Kendra on Top, though Wilkinson described their encounters as "awkward".

Van Amstel returned for season 15 of Dancing with the Stars, the All Stars season, and was partnered with former contestant, Sabrina Bryan. In the sixth week of the competition, the pair scored the first perfect 30 of the season. This was also Van Amstel's first perfect score ever after nine seasons on Dancing with the Stars. The couple made it to the sixth week, but were eliminated, despite being at the top of the leaderboard, resulting in an eighth-place finish. This was also the same week that Bryan was shockingly eliminated in her original season. In Week 8, Van Amstel was chosen by Kelly Monaco and her partner Val Chmerkovskiy to be their partner in their trio dance.

Van Amstel was not asked back for season 16 of Dancing with the Stars.

On September 2, 2015, he was announced as a pro for season 21 after a 5-season hiatus. He was paired with celebrity chef, Paula Deen. They were eliminated on week 6 of competition and finished in 9th place.

Van Amstel returned to the show for season 31. He was partnered with actress Cheryl Ladd.

Other work
During his time off from Dancing With The Stars, Van Amstel set up a not-for-profit dance company called "Visionworx Dance Theater," which combines all four major dance forms. He also choreographed and appeared on numerous TV shows such as The Suite Life of Zack & Cody, Hannah Montana, and All My Children.

After season six of Dancing with the Stars, Van Amstel was asked to create and choreograph a show called Ballroom With A Twist, which featured a rotating cast of dancers. The show also featured former American Idol contestants including David Hernandez and Carly Smithson. Ballroom With A Twist toured in theaters around the country. Van Amstel is no longer associated with the show.

He choreographed seven dances on season 5 of So You Think You Can Dance. Three of the seven dances made it to the finale and were mentioned as the judges' favorite picks at the Kodak theater in Hollywood. He continued choreographing in seasons 6, 7, and 8. 

Van Amstel runs a dance fitness program, LaBlast. LaBlast DVDs were released in early 2012.  During the summer of that year, Van Amstel started a fitness clothing line, branded LVA.

In fall 2014, Van Amstel was seen as a judge on the Dutch show Celebrity Pole Dancing, a show where Dutch celebrities are taught how to pole dance and perform.

Personal life
Van Amstel is openly gay. However, he does not explicitly use the word "gay" because he does not want to be stigmatized. On January 8, 2017, Van Amstel married his long-time boyfriend Joshua Lancaster in Sundance, Utah. They have two adopted sons, Daniel and Jonathan.

In November 2019, Van Amstel made headlines after he revealed that a substitute teacher shamed his son for having two gay dads and subjected his fifth-grade class to a 10-minute anti-gay lecture. The school promptly fired the teacher.

Dancing with the Stars performances

With Trista Sutter

With Lisa Rinna

With Monique Coleman

With Priscilla Presley

With Kelly Osbourne

Due to Len Goodman's absence in week 2, the 7 was awarded by stand-in guest judge Baz Luhrmann.

With Niecy Nash

With Margaret Cho

With Kendra Wilkinson

The additional scores of 7 and 8 were awarded by guest judge Donnie Burns.

With Sabrina Bryan

The additional score of 8.5 was awarded by guest judge Paula Abdul.

With Paula Deen

1 Score given by guest judge Alfonso Ribeiro.

2 This week only, for "Partner Switch-Up" week, Deen performed with Mark Ballas instead of Louis van Amstel. Louis performed with Tamar Braxton.

3 Score given by guest judge Maksim Chmerkovskiy.

4 Score given by guest judge Olivia Newton-John.

With Cheryl Ladd

References

External links
 
 LouisLetsDance.com
 LaBlastfitness.com

1972 births
Living people
American ballroom dancers
Dutch ballroom dancers
20th-century American dancers
Dutch male dancers
Dutch emigrants to the United States
LGBT choreographers
Dutch LGBT entertainers
Entertainers from Amsterdam
Van Amstel, Louis
Participants in American reality television series
Ballroom dancers
Gay dancers
American male dancers